Ctenucha annulata is a moth of the family Erebidae. It is found in Bolivia.Genus name Ctenucha was coined by William Kirby from the Greek meaning "having a comb", a reference to the showy antennae of some species.

References

annulata
Moths described in 1904